Jean Vodaine (6 July 1921—8 August 2006), born Vladimir Kavčič, was a Franco-Slovenian poet, writer, typographer and painter who won many international awards. He was born on 6 July 1921 in Volče, Slovenia. From the second half of the 19th century, Slovene lands experienced quite intense emigration. Some of the Slovene emigrants ended up in France, most of them in Lorraine, where they preserved their cultural life through societies. Writers were also among the emigrants, most significantly Vodaine. In a Lorrainian village, he founded the international literary magazine Dire, which was famous for its luxurious typographical design. Vodaine was also a painter and a poet, as well as a prominent translator of Slovene poetry. Along with the painter Veno Pilon, he compiled a short anthology of translated Slovene poetry, but they did not manage to realize their idea of a comprehensive anthology. Vodaine's poetic oeuvre consists of more than ten poetry collections that are stylistically fairly diverse, and he would often sing Lorraine's praises.

References

Further reading
 Marie-Paule Doncque, Philippe Hoch, Jean Vodaine, le passeur de mots : typographie & poésie, published by Médiathèque du Pontiffroy de Metz and the Bibliothèque nationale du Luxembourg, 1997
 Robert Sabatier, Histoire de la poésie française, Albin Michel, 1975, p. 322.
 Urh Ferlež. Quelques remarques sur la vie et l'ouvre de Jean Vodaine, pour honorer le centenaire de sa naissance. Vestnik za tuje jezike letnik 13/1, 2021, pp. 297-307.

20th-century Slovenian writers
20th-century French writers
Typographers and type designers
1921 births
2006 deaths
Slovenian poets
Slovenian male poets
Yugoslav emigrants to France